David Le Marquand (born 1950) is a former Jersey international lawn bowler.

Bowls career
Le Marquand has represented Jersey at four consecutive Commonwealth Games, from 1986 to 1998. He took part in the singles event at the 1986 Commonwealth Games, the pairs event at the 1990 Commonwealth Games, the singles event at the 1994 Commonwealth Games and finally the singles event at the 1998 Commonwealth Games.

He became a British champion after winning the 1998 pairs title, at the British Isles Bowls Championships, with Peter Le Long.

References

Jersey bowls players
1950 births
Living people
Bowls players at the 1986 Commonwealth Games
Bowls players at the 1990 Commonwealth Games
Bowls players at the 1994 Commonwealth Games
Bowls players at the 1998 Commonwealth Games
Bowls European Champions